The Bowling at the 1987 Southeast Asian Games result. This event was held between 12 September to 16 September at the Ancol Bowling Centre.

Medal summary

Men's

Women

Medal table

References
 http://eresources.nlb.gov.sg/newspapers/Digitised/Article/straitstimes19870913-1.2.43.4
 http://eresources.nlb.gov.sg/newspapers/Digitised/Article/straitstimes19870914-1.2.43.35
 https://eresources.nlb.gov.sg/newspapers/Digitised/Article/straitstimes19870916-1.2.46.13.12.aspx
 http://eresources.nlb.gov.sg/newspapers/Digitised/Article/straitstimes19870917-1.2.57.22.4

1987 Southeast Asian Games
Southeast Asian Games
1987